Missing Links Volume Three is a compilation album of rare and previously unreleased songs by The Monkees, issued by Rhino Records in 1996. It is the third and final volume of a three-volume set, preceded by Missing Links in 1987 and Missing Links Volume Two in 1990.

While many of the tracks had been featured in the Monkees' television series, only six of the tracks had ever been issued commercially: "Steam Engine" and "Love to Love" had first appeared on the Australian compilation Monkeemania (40 Timeless Hits) in 1979; "Tema Dei Monkees" and "She Hangs Out" had been issued as singles (in Italy and Canada, respectively) and had been collected on the compilation Monkee Business in 1982; the alternate mix of "Circle Sky" had first appeared on the compilation Monkee Flips in 1984; and "Tear the Top Right Off My Head" had first appeared on the Listen to the Band box set in 1991.

The release marks the first time the television edit of the series' opening theme song was made available (not counting the TeeVee Tunes 1987 release, Television's Greatest Hits Volume II, where the theme appeared as track 25 on the CD version). All previous releases of the theme song featured the album version, which is twice as long but lacks the television version's final verse.

"Little Red Rider" and "Hollywood" were re-recorded by Michael Nesmith for his solo album Magnetic South.

Originally issued only on CD, a vinyl version was released in 2021 from Friday Music for Record Store Day.

Track listing

Session information
"(Theme From) The Monkees" (TV version)
Written by Tommy Boyce and Bobby Hart
Lead vocal by Micky Dolenz
Backing vocal: Micky Dolenz
Guitar: Wayne Erwin and Gerry McGee
Bass: Larry Taylor
Drums: Billy Lewis
Tambourine: Gene Estes
Finger Snaps: Unknown
Produced by Tommy Boyce and Bobby Hart
Recorded at RCA Victor Studios, Hollywood, CA, August 6, 1966, during the sessions for More of the Monkees

"Kellogg's Jingle"
Lead vocal by Micky Dolenz
Backing vocal: Tommy Boyce
Guitar: Wayne Erwin, Gerry McGee, and Louie Shelton
Bass: Larry Taylor
Drums: Billy Lewis
A commercial jingle sung by Micky, with the instrumental backing track borrowing riffs from the theme song 
Recorded in Hollywood, 1966, during the sessions for The Monkees
 
"We'll Be Back in a Minute"
Written by Micky Dolenz
Vocals by Micky Dolenz
Acoustic Guitar: Micky Dolenz
Banjo: Henry Diltz
Bass: Chip Douglas
Unknown: Kazoo, handclaps, knee slaps
Produced by Brendan Cahill and Micky Dolenz
Engineered by: Bill Lazerus
Recorded at Sunset Sound Recorders, Hollywood, July 1, 1969, during the sessions for The Monkees Present

"Through the Looking Glass" (previously unissued alternate version) (a.k.a. first recorded version)
Written by Red Baldwin, Tommy Boyce, and Bobby Hart
Lead vocal by Micky Dolenz
Backing vocals: Micky Dolenz, Davy Jones, Tommy Boyce, Bobby Hart, and Ron Hicklin 
Guitar: Wayne Erwin, Gerry McGee, and Louie Shelton
Acoustic Guitar: Tommy Boyce
Bass: Larry Taylor
Drums: Billy Lewis
Tack piano: Michel Rubini
Tambourine: Alan Estes
Timpani: Alan Estes
Produced by Tommy Boyce and Bobby Hart
Recorded at RCA Victor Studios, Hollywood, September 10 and 24, 1966, during the sessions for More of the Monkees. It was later re-cut for The Birds, The Bees & the Monkees and released on Instant Replay.

"Propinquity (I've Just Begun to Care)" 
Written by Michael Nesmith
Lead vocal by Michael Nesmith
Harmony vocal: Michael Nesmith
Acoustic Guitar: Wayne Moss
Steel Guitar: Lloyd Green
Banjo: Sonny Osborne
Bass: Norbert Putnam
Drums: Kenny Buttrey
Organ: David Briggs
Produced by Michael Nesmith and Felton Jarvis
Engineered by: Al Pachucki
Recorded at RCA Victor Studios, Nashville, May 28, and August 21, 1968, during the sessions for Head 
One of the songs that Michael Nesmith had written before he became a member of the Monkees

"Penny Music"
Written by Michael Leonard, Jon Stroll, and Bobby Weinstein
Lead vocal by Davy Jones
Backing vocals: Bill Chadwick and Davy Jones
All others unknown
Produced by Bill Chadwick and Davy Jones
Engineered by: Pete Abbott
Recorded at RCA Victor Studios, Hollywood, May 1 and July 11, 1969, during the sessions for The Monkees Present

"Tear the Top Right off My Head"
Written by Peter Tork
Lead vocal by Peter Tork
Backing vocal: Micky Dolenz
Fuzz Guitar: Peter Tork
Acoustic Guitar: Lance Wakely
Bass: Ron Brown?, Peter Tork?, Lance Wakely?
Drums: Dewey Martin
Harmonica: Lance Wakely
Produced by The Monkees
Recorded at Western Recorders, February 5, 6, and 8, and RCA Victor Studios, Hollywood, February 12, 1968, during the sessions for The Birds, The Bees & The Monkees
First released on the 1991 Rhino CD box set Listen to the Band

"Little Red Rider"
Written by Michael Nesmith
Vocals by Michael Nesmith
Guitar: Al Casey and Louie Shelton
Bass: Max Bennett
Drums: Hal Blaine
Piano: Larry Knechtel
Tenor Saxophone: Clifford Solomon
Trumpet: Mack Johnson
Trombone: Lester Robertson
Cowbell: Unknown
Produced by Michael Nesmith
Engineered by: Pete Abbott
Recorded at RCA Victor Studios, Hollywood, May 28 and June 17 and 26, 1969, during the sessions for The Monkees Present

"You're So Good"
Written by Robert Stone
Lead vocal by Micky Dolenz
Guitar: James Burton and Louie Shelton
Lead electric Guitar: Unknown
Bass: Bob West
Drums: Earl Palmer
Cowbell: Earl Palmer
Piano: Michel Rubini
Tenor Saxophone: Clifford Solomon
Trumpet: Mack Johnson
Trombone: Lester Robertson
Horn: John Williams
Produced by Michael Nesmith
Engineered by: Pete Abbott
Recorded at RCA Victor Studios, Hollywood, May 27 and June 26, 1969, during the sessions for The Monkees Present 
Unique in the Monkees' canon, as it was produced by Michael Nesmith, sung by Micky Dolenz and written by an outsider, Robert Stone. It also features Sam & The Goodtimers on the backing track.
The similarly titled "You're So Good to Me" was recorded the following year and released on Changes. Although only Jeff Barry and Bobby Bloom received credit for writing "You're So Good to Me", several sources claim Robert Stone to be a third composer of the song.

"Look Down"
Written by Carole King and Toni Stern
Lead vocal by Davy Jones
Backing vocal: Carole King
Guitar: Dennis Budimir, Al Casey, and Tommy Tedesco
Bass: Larry Knechtel
Drums: Hal Blaine
Tambourine: Kenneth Watson
Bells: Kenneth Watson
Piano: Michel Rubini
Saxophone: Jim Horn and Jay Migliori
Trumpet: Jules Chaikin and Tony Terran
Trombone: Lew McCreary
Horn: Shorty Rogers
Produced by The Monkees
Recorded at T.T.G Studios, Hollywood, April 6, 1968, during the sessions for Head. It was considered for, but rejected from, Changes.

"Hollywood"
Written by Michael Nesmith
Lead vocal by Michael Nesmith
Guitar: Michael Nesmith, Harold Bradley, and Felton Jarvis
Steel Guitar: Lloyd Green
Banjo: Bobby Thompson
Bass: Norbert Putnam
Drums: Kenny Buttrey
Piano: David Briggs
Harmonica: Charlie McCoy
Violin: Buddy Spicher
Produced by Michael Nesmith and Felton Jarvis
Engineered by: Al Pachucki and Bill Vandevort
Recorded at RCA Victor Studios, Nashville, May 29 and 31, 1968, during the sessions for Head

"Midnight Train" (demo version)
Written by Micky Dolenz
Lead vocal by Micky Dolenz
Harmony vocal: Coco Dolenz (Micky's sister)
Acoustic Guitar: Micky Dolenz
Produced by Chip Douglas
Engineered by: Hank Cicalo
Recorded at RCA Victor Studios, Hollywood, February 24, 1967, during the sessions for Headquarters. It was later re-cut during the sessions for The Monkees Present and released on Changes.
While Micky Dolenz is officially credited as the writer of the song, several sites and sources claim Chris McCarty, Kenny Lee Lewis and Steve Miller to have co-written the track. These findings are incorrect, as the song co-written by McCarty, Lewis and Miller is a completely different song from the one written by Dolenz.

"She Hangs Out" (single version)
Written by Jeff Barry
Lead vocal by Davy Jones
Backing vocal: Davy Jones and Unknown
Guitars: Al Gorgoni, Don Thomas, and Hugh McCracken 
Bass: Lou Mauro 
Drums: Herb Lovelle 
Clavinet: Stan Free 
Organ: Arthur Butler 
Tambourine: Thomas Cerone 
Produced and Arranged By: Jeff Barry 
Engineered By: Ray Hall
Recorded at RCA Studio B, New York City, January 21 (11:00 A.M. - 7:00 P.M.) and 24, and February 4 and 5, 1967, during the sessions for Headquarters. It was later re-cut for Pisces, Aquarius, Capricorn & Jones Ltd..
While Jeff Barry is officially credited as the writer of the song, several sites and sources claim Ellie Greenwich to have co-written the track.
First released on the 1982 Rhino compilation album Monkee Business

"Shake 'Em Up"
Written by Jerry Leiber and Mike Stoller
Lead vocal by Micky Dolenz
Backing vocals: Micky Dolenz and Coco Dolenz
Electric Guitar: Keith Allison
Acoustic Guitar: Bill Chadwick
Bass: Chip Douglas
Drums: Eddie Hoh
Clarinet: Henry Diltz
Produced by The Monkees
Recorded at RCA Victor Studios, Hollywood, February 24, 1968, during the sessions for The Birds, The Bees & The Monkees. It was considered for, but rejected from, Changes.

"Circle Sky" (alternate mix)
Written by Michael Nesmith
Lead vocal by Michael Nesmith
Guitar: Michael Nesmith, Keith Allison, and Bill Chadwick
Bass: Richard Dey
Drums: Eddie Hoh
Organ: Michael Nesmith
Percussion: Michael Nesmith, and Eddie Hoh
Produced by The Monkees
Recorded at RCA Victor Studios, Hollywood, December 9 and 17, 1967 and January 6 and 8, 1968, during the sessions for The Birds, The Bees & The Monkees
This "vocals up" mix was done in the spring of 1969 and was going to be released on Colgems single 1038 (an export single released in April 1969) as the B-side to "Porpoise Song".  It was later decided to use the original soundtrack mix.
This alternate "vocals up" mix was first released on the 1984 Rhino compilation album Monkee Flips

"Steam Engine" (previously unissued alternate mix)
Written by Chip Douglas
Lead vocal by Micky Dolenz
Backing vocals: Micky Dolenz, Chip Douglas, Clydie King, Jerry Yester, and Unknown
Guitar: Clarence White
Steel Guitar: Orville "Red" Rhodes
Bass: Lyle Ritz
Drums: Jim Gordon
Tambourine: Eddie Hoh
Organ: Bill Martin
Reed: Bill Green and Bob Hardaway
Trumpet: Bill Peterson, Sanford Skinner, and Tony Terran
Trombone: Bobby Knight and Lew McCreary
Produced by Chip Douglas
Engineered by: Eddie Brackett
Recorded at Western Recorders, May 12, and RCA Victor Studios, Hollywood, July 8, 1969, during the sessions for The Monkees Present. It was originally considered for, but rejected from, Changes. 
This mix of the song is a previously unreleased vintage mix from the late '60s, different from the mixes released on Monkeemania (40 Timeless Hits), Monkee Business and Listen to the Band.

"Love to Love" (previously unissued alternate mix)
Written by Neil Diamond
Lead vocal by Davy Jones 
Guitars: Al Gorgoni, Don Thomas, and Hugh McCracken 
Bass: Louis Mauro and James Tyrell 
Drums: Herb Lovelle 
Clavinet: Stan Free 
Organ: Arthur Butler 
Tambourine: Thomas Cerone 
Produced and Arranged By: Jeff Barry 
Engineered By: Ray Hall 
Recorded at RCA Studio B, New York City, January 21 (11:00 A.M. - 7:00 P.M.) and 24, and February 4 and 5, 1967, and August 5, 1969, during the sessions for Headquarters, with the vocal being re-recorded during the sessions for The Monkees Present.
This mix is a previously unreleased true stereo mix, different from the mixes released on Monkeemania (40 Timeless Hits), Monkee Business and Listen to the Band. 
This 1969 version was later re-released on the 2016 album Good Times!, featuring new backing vocals from Micky Dolenz and Peter Tork.

"She'll Be There"
Written by Sharon Sheeley and Raul Abeyta
Lead vocal by Micky Dolenz
Harmony vocal: Coco Dolenz
Acoustic Guitar: Micky Dolenz
Produced by Douglas Farthing-Hatlelid
Engineered by: Hank Cicalo
Recorded at RCA Victor Studios, Hollywood, February, 1967, during the sessions for Headquarters
Micky and his sister Coco were responsible for the arrangement of this song. However, the identity of the composer was unknown at the time of this release and, as a result, no official writer's credit was included.

"How Insensitive"
Written by Vinicus DeMaraes, Norman Gimbel and Antonio Carlos Jobim
Lead vocal by Michael Nesmith
Guitar: Michael Nesmith, Harold Bradley, and Felton Jarvis
Steel Guitar: Lloyd Green
Banjo: Bobby Thompson
Bass: Norbert Putnam
Drums: Kenny Buttrey
Piano: David Briggs
Violin: Buddy Spicher
Produced by The Monkees
Engineered by: Al Pachucki
Recorded at RCA Victor Studios, Nashville, May 31, 1968, during the sessions for Head

"Merry Go Round"
Written by Diane Hildebrand and Peter Tork
Lead vocal by Peter Tork
Bass: Peter Tork
Organ: Peter Tork
Piano: Peter Tork
Unknown: Lance Wakely
Produced by The Monkees
Engineered by: Pete Abbott
Recorded at Western Recorders, January 20, and RCA Victor Studios, Hollywood, January 22 and 31, 1968, during the sessions for The Birds, The Bees & The Monkees

"Angel Band"
Traditional, arr. William Bradbury, Jefferson Hascall, and Michael Nesmith
Lead vocal by Michael Nesmith
Backing vocal: Michael Nesmith and Unknown
Acoustic Guitar: Al Casey and Louie Shelton
Drums: Hal Blaine
Double Bass: Max Bennett
Harmonium: Michel Rubini
Produced by Michael Nesmith
Recorded at RCA Victor Studios, Hollywood, June 9, 1969, during the sessions for The Monkees Present
"Angel Band" is in the public domain. The writing credit shown for Michael Nesmith is for the song's arrangement.

"Zor and Zam" (TV version) (a.k.a. first recorded version)
Written by Bill Chadwick and John Chadwick
Lead vocal by Micky Dolenz
Backing vocal: Unknown
Guitar - Keith Allison, and Bill Chadwick
Bass: Richard Dey
Drums: Eddie Hoh
Percussion: Unknown
Piano: Unknown
Unknown: Henry Diltz
Produced by The Monkees
Recorded at RCA Victor Studios, Hollywood, January 7, 13 and 18, and February 14, 1968, during the sessions for The Birds, The Bees & The Monkees. The album version was completed later that month.

"We'll Be Back in a Minute" #2
Written by Micky Dolenz
Lead vocal by Micky Dolenz
Guitar: Micky Dolenz
Banjo: Henry Diltz
Bass: Chip Douglas
Kazoo: Micky Dolenz
Produced by Brendan Cahill and Micky Dolenz
Engineered by: Bill Lazerus
Recorded at Sunset Sound Recorders, Hollywood, July 1, 1969

"Tema Dei Monkees"
Written by Tommy Boyce and Bobby Hart, with Carlo Nistri
Lead vocal by Micky Dolenz
Harmony vocals by Tommy Boyce and Bobby Hart
Backing vocal: Micky Dolenz
Guitar: Wayne Erwin, Gerry McGee, and Louie Shelton
Bass: Larry Taylor
Drums: Billy Lewis
Tambourine: Gene Estes
Produced by Tommy Boyce and Bobby Hart
Recorded at RCA Victor Studios, Hollywood, July 19, 1966 during the sessions for The Monkees. Other session info unknown.
First released on Monkee Business
An Italian language version of "(Theme From) The Monkees", this version is in a lower key than the English language version

References

The Monkees compilation albums
1996 compilation albums
Rhino Records compilation albums